Starlin Javier Santana (born 16 October 1988 in Palo Verde, Monte Cristi) is a Dominican footballer currently playing for FC Tuggen.

Career
Santana began his career with FC Spreitenbach before in 2002 was signed by FC Zürich. He left in summer 2007 FC Zürich and played in the first half of the season 2007/2008 eleven games on loan for Laredo Heat. After a half year with the first team of FC Zürich was loaned out in January 2009 for the rest of the season to FC Schaffhausen. He played eleven games for FC Schaffhausen and returned in summer 2009 to FC Zürich, but the contract was resigned in December 2009. After the releasing by FC Zürich signed on 19 January 2010 for FC Tuggen.

References

External links

1988 births
Living people
Dominican Republic footballers
Dominican Republic international footballers
FC Zürich players
Laredo Heat players
Expatriate footballers in Switzerland
FC Schaffhausen players
Expatriate soccer players in the United States
USL League Two players
Association football midfielders